The Red Line is a rapid transit line of the Washington Metro system, consisting of 27 stations in Montgomery County, Maryland, and Washington, D.C., in the United States. It is a primary line through downtown Washington and the oldest and busiest line in the system. It forms a long, narrow "U", capped by its terminal stations at Shady Grove and Glenmont.

Trains run most frequently during morning and evening rush hours (nominally four to eight minutes apart) and least frequently after 9:30 p.m. (nominally 15 to 18 minutes apart).

The Red Line is the only line in the system that does not share its tracks with another Metrorail line, though it operates parallel to CSX Transportation freight trains along the railroad's Metropolitan Subdivision from the D.C. neighborhood of Brentwood north past Silver Spring, Maryland and continuing through Twinbrook (Rockville, Maryland).

History 

Planning for Metro began with the Mass Transportation Survey in 1955, which attempted to forecast freeway and mass transit systems sufficient to meet the needs of 1980. In 1959, the study's final report recommended two rapid transit lines which anticipated subways in downtown Washington. Because the plan called for extensive freeway construction within the District of Columbia, alarmed residents lobbied for federal legislation creating a moratorium on freeway construction through July 1, 1962. The National Capital Transportation Agency's 1962 Transportation in the National Capital Region report anticipated much of the present Red Line route, with the Red Line following the Baltimore and Ohio Railroad right-of-way between Silver Spring and Rockville instead of a direct route between Bethesda and Rockville. 

With the formation of WMATA in October 1966, planning of the system shifted from federal hands to a regional body with representatives of the District, Maryland, and Virginia. Congressional route approval was no longer a key consideration. Instead, routes had to serve each suburban jurisdiction to assure that they would approve bond referendums to finance the system. Because the least expensive way to build into the suburbs was to use existing railroad right-of-ways, the Red Line took much of its present form, except that it continued to feature a further link between its two stems along the Baltimore and Ohio Railroad right-of-way.

By 1969, WMATA had decided on the current routing and stations, except for the extension beyond Rockville to Shady Grove. Montgomery County officials opposed ending the Red Line in downtown Rockville, saying it would cause congestion in the area and use scarce vacant land for a storage yard. Metro decided to propose to extend the red line one more station to Shady Grove and the U.S. Department of Transportation conditionally approved funding for the extension on July 26, 1975. 

Construction on the Red Line began with a groundbreaking ceremony at Judiciary Square on December 9, 1969. Construction proved difficult because the National Park Service prohibited a bridge across Rock Creek and required that the Red Line tunnel under that valley, the tunnel in turn caused both the Dupont Circle and Woodley Park stations to be built further underground. The Red Line was proposed to tunnel under Yuma Street from Connecticut Avenue to Wisconsin Avenue, but local residents sued and that court case delayed construction of the tunnel for two years, then WMATA finally won the right to build the tunnel there.

Service on the Red Line (and the Metro as a whole) began on March 27, 1976, with operation between Farragut North and Rhode Island Avenue. Gallery Place's opening was delayed due to a court order regarding lack of handicapped access, but it opened in the middle of the line on December 15, 1976. The western end of the line was extended one station to Dupont Circle on January 17, 1977, three stations to Van Ness–UDC on December 5, 1981, five stations to Grosvenor–Strathmore on August 25, 1984, and four stations to Shady Grove on December 15, 1984. The eastern end was extended one station from Rhode Island Avenue-Brentwood to Brookland-CUA on February 3, 1978. The eastern end was extended three stations to Silver Spring on February 6, 1978—which added Maryland to the system for the first time — two stations to Wheaton on September 22, 1990, and one station to Glenmont on July 25, 1998, completing the line.

The only time the Red Line shared tracks with another line was from January 27, 1997, to September 17, 1999, when the Green Line Commuter Shortcut used Red Line tracks from Brookland–CUA to Farragut North. A short time after the Green Line branch north of Fort Totten opened in the early 1990s, the "Green Line Commuter Shortcut" began as a six-month experiment. Passengers could board the Green Line between Greenbelt and West Hyattsville and travel as far as Farragut North without having to transfer; the trains bypassed Fort Totten via a single-track spur between the West Hyattsville and Brookland–CUA stations. Due to its success, the shortcut continued until the mid-city portion of the Green Line was completed in 1999.

The NoMa–Gallaudet University station (formerly New York Ave–Florida Ave–Gallaudet University), located between Union Station and Rhode Island Avenue–Brentwood, opened on November 20, 2004. It was the system's first infill station (i.e., a new station built between existing stations).

In November 2010, the WMATA authorized $37 million in capital improvements on the Red Line, a part of $212 million of work on the Red Line scheduled for 2010 to 2014.

In April 2012, a 1,200-car parking garage opened at the Glenmont station, joining the existing 1,700-car garage. Construction on the project, funded by the state of Maryland, began in December 2009.

All stations were reopened beginning on June 28, 2020.

From September 11, 2021, to January 16, 2022, the Metro station was closed due to the Rockville Canopy Replacement Project.

On February 25, 2022, WMATA opened a new entrance,  on the east side of Rockville Pike and a new elevator and staircase to platform at the Medical Center station, eliminating the need for thousands of daily riders who emerge from the station on the west side of the Pike to cross the busy six-lane road to reach the Walter Reed National Military Medical Center. In September 2009, Montgomery County applied for a $20 million federal grant, seeking to begin construction in 2011, but the project was not approved until 2013. Construction began in December 2017. The $68 million project, mostly funded by from the Department of Defense, also includes new deep elevators, better surface bicycle, and pedestrian facilities, a pedestrian tunnel under Rockville Pike, and an extension of the left-turn lane on southbound MD 355 that opened in late 2021.

Incidents and accidents

2004 Woodley Park accident 

On November 3, 2004, an out-of-service Red Line train rolled backward into the Woodley Park station and hit an in-service train stopped at the platform. Twenty people were injured. A 14-month investigation concluded that the train operator was most likely not alert. Safety officials estimated that at least 79 would have died had the train been full. The train operator was fired and Metro officials agreed to add rollback protection to more than 300 rail cars.

2009 train collision 

On June 22, 2009, at 5:03 p.m., a six-car train collided with and telescoped onto a stationary train between the Takoma and Fort Totten Metro stations. Eight passengers and a train operator were killed in the collision and at least 70 people were injured. It is the deadliest accident in the history of the Washington Metro. The National Transportation Safety Board's report of July 27, 2010, blamed the crash on a faulty track circuit, part of the automatic train control system. WMATA issued a list of planned changes.

Chronology 
Dates on which portions of the Red Line opened for service.

Route

The Red Line begins above ground at Shady Grove, and parallels CSX Transportation's Metropolitan Subdivision (served by MARC Brunswick Line trains) to south of Twinbrook. The route then enters a tunnel and curves west to run under Rockville Pike at North Bethesda. Until Tenleytown, the line follows the route of Rockville Pike and Wisconsin Avenue in a tunnel, except for a bridge over the Capital Beltway (I-495). The tunnel curves east at Tenleytown into Yuma Street to reach the Van Ness–UDC station, curving south there to travel under Connecticut Avenue through south of Farragut Square. A curve under Lafayette Park takes the tunnel east under G Street Northwest through the Metro Center and Gallery Place stations.

From Gallery Place through Judiciary Square, the line runs southeast, turning east again at D Street to reach Union Station. There it turns north and surfaces next to Union Station's platforms, follows the Washington Terminal yard tracks north to Brentwood where the line turns northwestward and again joins CSX Transportation's Metropolitan Subdivision tracks, running in a unique gauntlet arrangement with the freight railroad tracks straddling the Metro tracks. The Red Line continues in this manner northwest across the DC-Maryland line, through Takoma and past Silver Spring. It reenters a tunnel at 16th Street and heads north under Georgia Avenue to the end at Glenmont. 

The Metropolitan Subdivision right-of-way were part of the former Baltimore and Ohio Railroad route to downtown Washington, D.C. The MARC commuter rail system uses this parallel route with stops in Silver Spring and Rockville when traveling between Washington and Martinsburg, West Virginia, while Amtrak uses this parallel route with a stop in Rockville when traveling the Capitol Limited route between Washington, D.C., and the Chicago Union Station.

There is a maintenance yard between the NoMa–Gallaudet and Rhode Island Avenue–Brentwood stops.

Internally, WMATA calls the Red Line the Shady Grove Route (A) and the Glenmont Route (B), which meet at Metro Center.

The Red Line needs 44 trains (10 eight-car trains and 34 six-car trains, consisting of 284 rail cars) to run at peak capacity. Trains run most frequently during morning and evening rush hours (nominally four to eight minutes apart) and least frequently after 9:30 p.m. (nominally 15 to 18 minutes apart).

The Red and Green Lines are the only lines that do not enter Virginia.

Stations 
The line serves the following stations, from northwest to northeast:

Future 
In November 2010, the WMATA authorized $37 million in capital improvements on the Red Line, a part of $212 million of work on the Red Line scheduled for 2010 to 2014.

In 2011, the WMATA examined the possibility of extending the Red Line past the Shady Grove station to the Metropolitan Grove station by 2040.

In April 2012, a 1,200-car parking garage opened at the Glenmont station, joining the existing 1,700-car garage. Construction on the project, funded by the state of Maryland, began in December 2009.

On February 25, 2022, WMATA opened a new entrance,  on the east side of Rockville Pike and a new elevator and staircase to platform at the Medical Center station, eliminating the need for thousands of daily riders who emerge from the station on the west side of the Pike to cross the busy six-lane road to reach the Walter Reed National Military Medical Center. In September 2009, Montgomery County applied for a $20 million federal grant, seeking to begin construction in 2011, but the project was not approved until 2013. Construction began in December 2017. The $68 million project, mostly funded by from the Department of Defense, also includes new deep elevators, better surface bicycle, and pedestrian facilities, a pedestrian tunnel under Rockville Pike, and an extension of the left-turn lane on southbound MD 355 that opened in late 2021.

References

Further reading

External links 

 Red Line at world.nycsubway.org

 
Railway lines opened in 1976
1976 establishments in Washington, D.C.